Wyndham Paul Wise is a Canadian film historian, critic, editor and publisher. He was the founder and editor-in-chief of the film magazine Take One: Film & Television in Canada (1992-2006).

Career
Born in London, England, Wyndham Wise was raised in Don Mills, a suburb of Toronto. He has a M.A. from the Graduate School of Drama, University of Toronto, and a Master of Fine Arts from the Graduate Programme in Film and Video, York University. On stage as a child with the Don Mills Players, he was the first film contributor to the monthly city listings in Toronto Life magazine (1972–74).

During the mid-1970s, Wise was part of the nascent Toronto underground theatre scene, producing Shop-Talk (Toronto Free Theatre, 1976), Spinning (CEAC and P.S. 1. NYC, 1977) and Con/Notes (produced by Theatre Passe Muraille at CEAC, 1977) with Richard Shoichet.  He was cameraman and editor on several installations by the noted Canadian artist Noel Harding, and he also produced and directed three 16-mm shorts: Garbage (1974), A Sound Film (1975) and Spinning (1976). Wise was a volunteer driver during the first Toronto Festival of Festivals (1976) and appeared in commercials, on television and in feature films, including a bit part in the Toronto-shot children's classic The Black Stallion.  In 1982, he co-produced the documentary Liona Boyd First Lady of the Guitar for C Channel and Liona Boyd in Concert, which was broadcast on Global TV in 1983.

He founded and was the editor-in-chief of Take One: Film & Television in Canada, which was published from 1992—2006.  Over its 14-year publishing history it grew in stature to become Canada's finest film magazine, and introduced the term Toronto New Wave into the Canadian canon.

He taught film studies at Algoma University (1985 & 1988) and York University (1987–88), and media writing at Sheridan College (1989–93). He served as the last Toronto reporter for Cinema Canada magazine  (1988–89), launched Point of View magazine in 1990 for the Canadian Independent Film Caucus (now the Documentary Organization of Canada) and edited the final issue of Independent Eye (1991) for the Canadian Filmmakers Distribution Centre. In 1997, he was instrumental in founding the Toronto Film Critics Association and launched Canadian Screenwriter for the Writers Guild of Canada in 1998.

In 2001, Wise edited Take One's Essential Guide to Canadian Film, published by the University of Toronto Press, a concise history of Canadian cinema. In 2008, Wise was hired by the Canadian Society of Cinematographers to edit CSC News, which he transformed into  Canadian Cinematographer in 2009. That year, his historical survey "Up from the Underground: Filmmaking in Toronto from Winter Kept Us Warm to Shivers" appeared in Toronto on Film published by the Wilfrid Laurier Press.

He has lectured with the LIFE Institute at Ryerson University (now Toronto Metropolitan University), is a former contributor and consultant to the Northernstars.ca website, Historica's Canadian Encyclopedia and the author of over 400 articles, biographies, interviews and reviews. On occasion, he wrote under the pseudonym Paul Townend.

References

Canadian film critics
Canadian film historians
Canadian male non-fiction writers
Canadian magazine founders
Canadian magazine editors
Year of birth missing (living people)
Writers from Toronto
Canadian magazine publishers (people)
Academic staff of Algoma University
Academic staff of York University
Sheridan College alumni
Canadian film educators
Living people